Kinaskan Lake Provincial Park is a provincial park in British Columbia, Canada, located at the south end of Kinaskan Lake along the Stewart-Cassiar Highway near Mowdade Lake and southeast of Mount Edziza.  At the south end of the park, the Iskut River, of which the lake is an expansion, spills over 12.2-metre Cascade Falls.  The park is approximately 800 ha. in size.

See also
List of British Columbia provincial parks
List of lakes in British Columbia

References

Stikine Country
Provincial parks of British Columbia
Stikine Plateau
1987 establishments in British Columbia
Protected areas established in 1987